The Government of Amsterdam consists of several territorial and functional forms of local and regional government. The principal form of government is the municipality of Amsterdam, Netherlands. The municipality's territory covers the city of Amsterdam as well as a number of small towns. The city of Amsterdam is also part of several functional forms of regional government. These include the Waterschap (water board) of  Amstel, Gooi en Vecht, which is responsible for water management, and the Stadsregio (City Region) of Amsterdam, which has responsibilities in the areas of spatial planning and public transport.

The municipality of Amsterdam borders the municipalities of Diemen, Abcoude, Ouder-Amstel and Amstelveen in the south, Haarlemmermeer and Haarlemmerliede en Spaarnwoude in the west, and Zaanstad, Oostzaan, Landsmeer and Waterland in the north.

Municipal government

The city of Amsterdam is a municipality under the Dutch Municipalities Act. It is governed by a municipal council (gemeenteraad, also known as 'city council', the principal legislative authority), a municipal executive board (college van burgemeester en wethouders), and a mayor (burgemeester). The mayor is both a member of the municipal executive board and an individual authority with a number of statutory responsibilities, mainly in the area of maintaining public order. The municipal council has 45 seats. Its members are elected for a four-year term through citywide elections on the basis of  proportional representation. Under the Municipalities Act, the mayor is appointed for a six-year term by the national government upon nomination by the municipal council. The other members of the executive board (wethouders, or 'alderpersons') are appointed directly by the municipal council, but may be dismissed at any time after a no-confidence vote in the council. Because of this parliamentary system, the alderpersons are not appointed until a governing majority in the council has reached a coalition agreement following council elections.

In July 2010, Eberhard van der Laan (Labour Party) was appointed mayor of Amsterdam by the national government for a six-year term after being nominated by the Amsterdam municipal council. After the 2014 municipal council elections, a governing majority of D66, VVD and SP was formed - the first coalition without the Labour Party since World War II. Next to the mayor, the municipal executive board consists of eight wethouders ('alderpersons') appointed by the municipal council: four D66 alderpersons, two VVD alderpersons and two SP alderpersons.

Municipal Government 2006–2010
After the 2006 municipal elections a coalition was formed between PvdA and GroenLinks, with a majority of 27 out of 45. These elections saw a political landslide throughout the country, with a strong shift to the left, of which Amsterdam was a prime example. The much talked about all-left-wing coalition of PvdA, GroenLinks and SP that polls indicate would become possible after the national elections of 2006 and that was such a political success in Nijmegen had its largest majority in Amsterdam, apart from some small towns. PvdA even needed only 3 more seats to form a coalition and could thus take its pick, which forced potential coalition partners to give in on a lot of issues. In the case of GroenLinks, this was mostly the policy of preventive searching by the police, which they were opposed to but had to allow.

In total, 24 parties took part in the elections, including 11 new ones, but only 7 got seats.

Municipal Government 2010–2014
Dutch municipal elections, 2010:

Municipal Government 2014–2018

Dutch municipal elections, 2014:

Municipal Government 2018–2022
Dutch municipal elections, 2018:

| colspan="9" | 
|-
! style="text-align:center;" colspan=3 |Party
! style="text-align:center;"| Votes
! style="text-align:right;" | 
! style="text-align:right;" | 
! style="text-align:right;" | Seats
! style="text-align:right;" | 
|-
| bgcolor=| 
| align=left| GreenLeft
| 
| 70,880
| 20.4
| +9.6
| 10
| +4
|-
| bgcolor=| 
| align=left| Democrats 66
| 
| 55,724
| 16.1
| −10.7
| 8
| −6
|-
| bgcolor=| 
| align=left| People's Party for Freedom and Democracy
| 
| 39,702
| 11.4
| +0.2
| 6
| +0
|-
| bgcolor=| 
| align=left| Labour Party
| 
| 37,181
| 10.7
| −7.7
| 5
| −5
|-
| bgcolor=| 
| align=left| Socialist Party
| 
| 26,070
| 7.5
| −3.7
| 3
| −3
|-
| bgcolor=| 
| align=left| Party for the Animals
| 
| 24,672
| 7.1
| +4.3
| 3
| +2
|-
| bgcolor=| 
| align=left| Denk
| 
| 23,138
| 6.7
| New
| 3
| New
|-
| bgcolor=| 
| align=left| Forum for Democracy
| 
| 20,015
| 5.8
| New
| 3
| New
|-
| bgcolor=| 
| align=left| Christian Democratic Appeal
| 
| 11,991
| 3.5
| +0.7
| 1
| +0
|-
| bgcolor=#4878A8| 
| align=left| Party for the Elderly
| 
| 7,752
| 2.2
| +0.1
| 1
| +0
|-
| bgcolor=| 
| align=left| Christian Union
| 
| 6,837
| 2.0
| +0.2
| 1
| +1
|-
| bgcolor=| 
| align=left| Amsterdam Bij1
| 
| 6,571
| 1.9
| New
| 1
| New
|-
|colspan="9" style="background:#E9E9E9;"|
|-
| bgcolor=| 
| align=left| Pirate Party Amsterdam
| 
| 4,459
| 1.3
| −0.5
| 0
| +0
|-
| bgcolor=| 
| align=left| 50PLUS
| 
| 4,233
| 1.2
| New
| 0
| New
|-
| 
| colspan=2 align=left| Other
| 7,923
| 2.3
| 
| 0
| 
|- style="background-color:#E9E9E9"
| style="text-align:left;" colspan=3 |Total valid votes
| 347,148
| 100
| 
| 45
| 
|-
| colspan=3 align=left| Invalid/blank votes
| 4,511
| 1.3
| 
| 
| 
|- style="background-color:#E9E9E9"
| colspan=3 align=left| Total & turnout
| 351,659
| 51.2
| +1.9
| 
| 
|-
| align=left colspan=9 |Source: Verkiezingsuitslagen
|}

Municipal Government 2022–present

Boroughs

Unlike most other Dutch municipalities, Amsterdam is subdivided into eight boroughs (stadsdelen or 'districts'), a system that was implemented in the 1980s and significantly reformed in 2014. Before 2014, the boroughs were responsible for many activities that previously had been run by the central city. The idea was to bring the government closer to the people. All of these had their own district council (deelraad), chosen by a popular election. Local decisions were made at borough level, and only affairs pertaining the whole city (like major infrastructural projects), were delegated to the central city council. As of 2014, the powers of the boroughs have been significantly reduced, although they still have an elected council called bestuurscommissie ('district committee').

The boroughs are:
 Amsterdam-Centrum (English: Centre).
 Amsterdam-Noord
 Amsterdam-Oost
 Amsterdam-Zuid
 Amsterdam-West
 Amsterdam-Zuidoost
 Amsterdam Nieuw-West

The eighth, Westpoort, covers the western harbour area of Amsterdam. Because it has very few inhabitants it is governed by the central municipal council.

Mayors

The mayor of Amsterdam is the head of the city council. The current mayor is Femke Halsema. The mayors since World War II are:
        (1945–1946)
 Arnold Jan d'Ailly  (1946–1956)
 Gijs van Hall         (1956–1967)
 Ivo Samkalden         (1967–1977)
 Wim Polak             (1977–1983)
 Ed van Thijn          (1983–1994)
 Schelto Patijn        (1994–2001)
 Job Cohen             (2001–2010)
 Eberhard van der Laan (2010–2017)
 Femke Halsema         (2018-)

Population centers
Amsterdam, Driemond, Durgerdam, Holysloot, 't Nopeind, Osdorp, Ransdorp, Sloten, Sloterdijk, Zunderdorp.

International cooperation

Cities (and country) of international cooperation:
 Accra, Ghana
 Beira, Mozambique
 Budapest, Hungary
 İzmit, Turkey
 Managua, Nicaragua 
 Riga, Latvia
 Suriname

Sister ports:
 Accra, Ghana
 Beijing, China 
 Cape Town, South Africa
 Halifax, Canada
 San Pédro, Ivory Coast
 Xiamen, China

References

External links
 
 Publication by the SDU staatscourant
 Statistics Netherlands, publication on Amsterdam